Frantz Joseph (born June 12, 1986) is a former American football linebacker. He was signed by the Oakland Raiders as an undrafted free agent in 2009. He played college football at Florida Atlantic.

Joseph has also been a member of the Edmonton Eskimos and Hartford Colonials.

Early years
Joseph is of Haitian descent. His mother came to the United States from Haiti as a teenager and raised five children. She became his inspiration to pursue a career in football.

Professional career

Oakland Raiders
The Oakland Raiders, signed Joseph as an undrafted free agent following the 2009 NFL Draft. He was waived by the Raiders on July 14, 2009.

Edmonton Eskimos
Joseph was signed to the Edmonton Eskimos practice roster on September 28, 2009.

Harford Colonials
Joseph signed with the Hartford Colonials of the United Football League in August 2010.

Joseph was the subject of a book released in 2010 by Bobby Deren entitled Draft Season: Four Months on the Clock.

Spokane Shock
Joseph signed with the Spokane Shock of the Arena Football League on September 29, 2011.

References

Florida Atlantic Owls bio

External links
Just Sports Stats

1986 births
Living people
American football linebackers
American players of Canadian football
American sportspeople of Haitian descent
Boston College Eagles football players
Canadian football linebackers
Edmonton Elks players
Florida Atlantic Owls football players
Oakland Raiders players
Players of American football from Fort Lauderdale, Florida
Players of Canadian football from Fort Lauderdale, Florida
Hartford Colonials players
Fort Lauderdale High School alumni
Spokane Shock players
Tri-Cities Fever players